The Mean Checkers Machine is a 1980 video game designed by Lance Micklaus for The Software Exchange for the TRS-80 Level II Model I microcomputer.

Plot summary
The Mean Checkers Machine is a computer version of checkers with four levels of difficulty.

Reception
J. Mishcon reviewed The Mean Checkers Machine in The Space Gamer No. 32. Mishcon commented that "A super program. If you enjoy checkers, I heartily recommend this work."

Reviews
Creative Computing

References

1980 video games
TRS-80 games
TRS-80-only games
Video games based on board games
Video games developed in the United States